David Lynn Selby (born February 5, 1941) is an American film, television, and stage actor. He is best known for playing Quentin Collins on the daytime soap Dark Shadows (1968–71) and Richard Channing on the prime-time soap Falcon Crest (1982–90). Selby also had prominent roles in the television series Flamingo Road (1981–82) and the feature film Raise the Titanic (1980). Also a published writer, Selby has written several books, including novels, memoirs, and collections of poetry.

Early life
Selby was born February 5, 1941, in Morgantown, West Virginia, the son of Clyde Ira Selby, a carpenter, and his wife Sarah E. (née McIntyre). He attended West Virginia University, earning degrees in theater, followed by a PhD from Southern Illinois University.

Midway through his time at WVU, Selby joined the cast of Honey in the Rock, a civil war drama at Grandview State Park.

Career

Early TV and film roles (1960s and 1970s)
In 1968, Selby joined the cast of the TV series Dark Shadows as ghost Quentin Collins. After the series' cancellation in 1971, Selby played  Quentin Collins in Night of Dark Shadows, the second feature film based on the show, released later the same year. He reprised the role from the series for a series of Dark Shadows audio dramas from Big Finish Productions, beginning in 2006.

In 1972, Selby co-starred with Barbra Streisand in the movie Up the Sandbox. He continued to appear in a number of film and television roles during the 1970s, including U-Turn (1973), The Super Cops (1974) and Rich Kids (1979), and episodes of The Waltons (1974), Police Woman (1975), and Kojak (1976). He was part of the cast in the Emmy Award-winning miniseries Washington: Behind Closed Doors (1977).

In 1979, Selby declined the role of Gary Ewing in the TV series Knots Landing.

1980s
Selby was nominated for a Golden Raspberry Award for Worst Supporting Actor for his role in the 1980 film Raise the Titanic, which was met with a negative reception from critics and audiences along with poor box-office takings.

In 1981, Selby played the villainous Michael Tyrone in the final season of the prime-time serial Flamingo Road. After its cancellation in 1982, he joined the cast of Falcon Crest as Richard Channing, the illegitimate son of Jacqueline Perrault's (Lana Turner) with Angela Channing's husband Douglas Channing. Originally considered an antagonist, Richard gradually became more of a protagonist, and by the final season, he was the central character of the show (in part due to the health-related absence of Wyman). Selby was nominated for six Soap Opera Digest Awards for his role of Richard, winning one. In all, Selby appeared in 209 episodes of the series.

Later career
Selby continued in numerous film and TV roles during the 1990s and 2000s, including Dying Young (1991), White Squall (1996) and Surviving Christmas (2004), and episodes of series such as Cold Case (2007) and Mad Men (2009).

To mark the 200th anniversary of Abraham Lincoln's birthday in 2009, Selby appeared onstage with Barack Obama and portrayed Lincoln in a scene from the play The Heavens Are Hung in Black at the reopening of Ford's Theatre. Selby had also played Abraham Lincoln in a 1998 episode of the series Touched by an Angel, titled "Beautiful Dreamer".

Selby made an appearance in the 2012 [[Dark Shadows (film)|film adaptation of Dark Shadows]], one of four cast members from the original series to feature in the movie. The same year, he co-starred in Batman: The Dark Knight Returns, a two-part direct-to-video animated film adaptation of the 1986 graphic novel The Dark Knight Returns, portraying Commissioner James Gordon.

In 2017, Selby had a recurring role in the drama Legion.

Writing
Selby is also an accomplished writer. His work includes the plays Lincoln and James and Final Assault as well as the poetry collections My Mother's Autumn and Happenstance. Novels he has written include Lincoln's Better Angel and The Blue Door. A Better Place combines memoir and social commentary to discuss Selby's upbringing. In 2010, he published My Shadowed Past, chronicling what it was like to work on Dark Shadows''.

Awards
In 1998, West Virginia University awarded Selby its first Life Achievement Award from the College of Creative Arts. He received an honorary doctorate in 2004.

Filmography

Films

Television

References

External links

 
 
 
 
 Official David Selby Twitter Page
 Criseyde's David Selby Site
 Original Dark Shadows Audio Dramas starring David Selby

1941 births
Living people
20th-century American male actors
21st-century American male actors
Male actors from New York City
Male actors from West Virginia
American male film actors
American male soap opera actors
American male stage actors
Morgantown High School alumni
People from Mount Pleasant, New York
Southern Illinois University alumni
West Virginia University alumni
People from Morgantown, West Virginia